Christoph Monschein (born 22 October 1992) is an Austrian professional footballer who plays as a forward for Austrian Bundesliga club SV Ried.

Club career

Early years
Monschein began his footballing career with hometown club SC Brunn am Gebirge. In 2014, he moved to ASK Ebreichsdorf. In January 2016 he joined his first professional club Admira Wacker Mödling. He made his Austrian Football Bundesliga debut on 7 February 2016 in a 2–1 loss to Red Bull Salzburg, when he came off the bench in closing stages for Lukas Grozurek.

Austria Wien
On 1 July 2017, Monschein joined Austria Wien for a reported fee of €600,000. He signed a three-year contract. During his time in Vienna he made 116 Bundesliga appearances, scoring 36 goals.

LASK
In the summer of 2021, he joined LASK on a three-year contract.

On 27 January 2022, Monschein was loaned to Rheindorf Altach until the end of the season.

SV Ried
Monschein joined SV Ried on 13 June 2022, signing a two-year contract with an option for an additional year.

International career
In August 2020, Monschein was called up for the Austria national team for the first time by national team coach Franco Foda. He made his debut in September 2020 when he came on as a substitute in the 81st minute for Florian Grillitsch in a UEFA Nations League against Romania.

Career statistics

References

1992 births
Living people
Austrian footballers
Austria international footballers
FC Admira Wacker Mödling players
FK Austria Wien players
LASK players
SC Rheindorf Altach players
SV Ried players
Austrian Football Bundesliga players
Association football forwards
People from Mödling District
Footballers from Lower Austria